The Ladies' Diary: or, Woman's Almanack appeared annually in London from 1704 to 1841 after which it was succeeded by The Lady's and Gentleman's Diary. It featured material relating to calendars etc. including sunrise and sunset times and phases of the moon, as well as important dates (eclipses, holidays, school terms, etc.), and a chronology of remarkable events.

The  subtitle indicated its serious purpose: "Containing New Improvements in ARTS and SCIENCES, and many entertaining PARTICULARS: Designed for the USE AND DIVERSION OF THE FAIR SEX." These included riddles (called enigmas), rebuses, charades, scientific queries, and mathematical questions. A typical volume in the series included answers submitted by readers to problems posed the previous year and a set of new problems, nearly all proposed by readers. Both puzzle and answer (revealed the following year) were often in verse.  Each cover featured a picture of a prominent English woman.

Sometimes the subtitles were even more specific. For example, in 1836 the full title was The Ladies Diary, For the Year of Our Lord 1835, Being the Third After Bissextile. Designed specifically For the Amusement and Entertainment of The Fair Sex With An Appendix of Curious and Valuable Mathematical Papers For the Use of Students. The Hundred and Thirty Second Almanack Published of this Kind. Also The Gentleman's Diary Or, The Mathematical Repository; An Almanack For the Year of Our Lord 1835 and 1836 Being The Third or Bissextile or Leap Year Containing many Useful and entertaining Particulars peculiarly adapted to the Ingenious Gentleman engaged in the delightful Study and Practice of the Mathematics.

The first editor and publisher, John Tipper, began the almanac by publishing a calendar, recipes, medicinal advice, stories and ended with "special rhyming riddles." By the 1709 issue, the contents changed to exclude recipes, medicinal advice, and stories and include more puzzles from both Tipper and those sent in by readers.

The second editor, Henry Beighton, took over the almanac after Tipper's death in 1713. He continued to publish the almanac rich in puzzles, and in 1720 began to include more difficult puzzles dealing with Newtonian infinitesimal calculus.

Joan Baum notes that

See also
List of 18th-century British periodicals for women
List of scientific journals in mathematics
Gentleman's Diary
The Lady's and Gentleman's Diary

References

Bibliography
Leder, Gilah (1981) The Ladies' Diary. Australian Mathematics Teacher 37(2):3–5.
Perl, Teri (1977) The Ladies' Diary. . .Circa 1700. Mathematics Teacher 70(4):354–358.
Costa, Shelly (2002) The Ladies' Diary: Gender, Mathematics, and Civil Society in Early Eighteenth-Century England
Perl, Teri (1979) "The Ladies' Diary or Woman's Almanack, 1704–1841." Historia Mathematica 6 (1979), 36–53.

Almanacs
Annual magazines published in the United Kingdom
Defunct magazines published in the United Kingdom
Magazines established in 1704
Magazines disestablished in 1841
1704 establishments in England
Magazines published in London
Women in London